Pierre-Martial Cibot (born at Limoges, France, 14 August 1727; died at Beijing, China, 8 August 1780) was a French Jesuit missionary to China.

Life

He entered the Society of Jesus 7 November 1743, and taught humanities with much success. He was sent to China at his own request 7 March 1758, and arrived at Macao 25 July. He reached Beijing 6 June 1760, joining the Jesuits who were retained at the court of the emperor.

Cibot during his many years in China found time to devote to historical and scientific studies. Modesty prevented him from signing many of his essays. His style was somewhat diffuse, and his writings were valued chiefly for their variety and the information which they contained.

Works

Many of his notes and observations on the history and literature of the Chinese were published in the "Mémoires concernant l'histoire, les sciences les arts, les moeurs, les usages, etc., des Chinois: par les missionaires de Pékin" (Paris, 1776–89, 16 vols.). These volumes were at the time the chief source of information in Europe regarding China and its people.

Cibot's most lengthy work, his "Essai sur l'antiquité des Chinois", appeared in the first volume of the "Mémoires". In it he claims Yao (2356 B.C.) as the founder of the Chinese Empire. This view was not held, however, by other contemporary writers: in the second volume of the "Mémoires" his colleague, Father Amiot, in his "L'antiquité des Chinois prouvée par les monuments", defended the traditional Chinese chronology.

Cibot also instituted a comparison between the Jews and the Chinese in connection with a commentary on the Book of Esther (Mémoires, vols. XIV-XVI). He collected a herbarium and  contributed a number of articles on various topics in natural science to the "Mémoires", e.g. "Notices de quelques plantes arbrisseaux de la Chine" (vol. III), "Observations sur les plantes, les fleurs, et les arbres de Chine qu'il est possible et utile de se procurer en France"; "Notice sur le borax"; "Mémoire sur les chevaux" (vol. XI); "Notice sur l'hirondelle, sur le cerf et sur la cigale" (vol. XII), etc.

References

Attribution

People from Limoges
1727 births
1780 deaths
18th-century French Jesuits
French Roman Catholic missionaries
18th-century French historians
French sinologists
French male non-fiction writers
Roman Catholic missionaries in China
Jesuit missionaries
French expatriates in China
18th-century French male writers